Airswimming is the first play written by Charlotte Jones.  Its 1997 premiere at the Battersea Arts Centre was directed by Anna Mackmin (making her debut as a director) and featured Rosie Cavaliero and Scarlett Mackmin.  It is based on two women being imprisoned in a mental asylum in the 1920s for having children outside of marriage, only being released in the 1970s.

External links
Author biography

1997 plays